Jonathan Shawn Karsh (born October 16, 1971) is an American film director, producer, and former television host.

Career 
Karsh was the winner of the Audience Award and Best Director Award at the 2003 Sundance Film Festival for his directorial debut, the documentary My Flesh and Blood, which aired on HBO in 2004. The film went on to win the Emmy Award for Best Documentary, and the top awards at the Amsterdam International Film Festival and Febiofest.

Karsh later made documentary films for MTV and AMC, and produced reality shows for CBS, ABC, and ABC family.

Karsh was the host of Kid Nation, a controversial reality show that aired on CBS in fall, 2007.

References

External links

American film directors
Living people
1971 births
Artists from Sacramento, California
University of California, Davis alumni